Grosse Ile High School (GIHS) is a public high school in Grosse Ile Township, Michigan, United States. It is part of the Grosse Ile Township Schools district.

Demographics 
The demographic breakdown of the 645 students enrolled for the 2016-17 school year was:
 Male - 51.8%
 Female - 48.2%
 Native American/Alaskan - 0.6%
 Asian - 3.1%
 Black - 0.9%
 Hispanic - 5.0%
 White - 89.0&
 Multiracial - 1.4%

6.2% of the students were eligible for free or reduced-cost lunch. For 2016-17, Grosse Ile was a Title I school.

Athletics 
The Grosse Ile Red Devils compete in the Huron League. The school colors are scarlet and gray. The following Michigan High School Athletic Association (MHSAA) sanctioned sports are offered.

 Baseball (boys) 
 Basketball (girls and boys) 
 Competitive cheerleading (girls)
 State champion - 2002, 2010
 Cross country (girls and boys) 
 Football (boys)
 Golf (girls and boys) 
 Boys state champion - 1998, 1999, 2000, 2002, 2003
 Girls state champion - 1996, 1997, 1998, 2000, 2002, 2003, 2009, 2011, 2013
 Ice hockey (boys)
 Lacrosse (boys)
 Soccer (girls and boys) 
 Boys state champion - 2002, 2019 
 Softball (girls)
 State champion - 1977
 Swim and dive (girls) 
 Tennis (girls and boys) 
 Boys state champion - 2005, 2007 (spring)
 Girls state champion - 2014
 Track and field (girls and boys) 
 Boys state champion 1959
 Volleyball (girls) 
 Wrestling (boys)

Notable alumni 
 Max Gail, actor
 William S. Knudsen, automotive industry executive

References

External links 
 

Schools in Wayne County, Michigan
Public high schools in Michigan